Martin Joseph Neylon (February 13, 1920 – April 13, 2004) was a Roman Catholic bishop.

Born in Buffalo, New York, Neylon was ordained to the priesthood, for the Society of Jesus, on June 18, 1950. On October 9, 1970, Neylon was appointed coadjutor vicar apostolic of the Caroline and Marshall Islands and titular bishop of Libertina and was ordained bishop on February 2, 1971. On May 3, 1979, he was appointed bishop of the new Diocese of Caroline-Marshalls. Then on April 23, 1993, the name of the diocese was changed to the Diocese of Caroline Islands. On May 25, 1995, Neylon retired.

Notes

1920 births
2004 deaths
Religious leaders from Buffalo, New York
20th-century American Jesuits
21st-century American Jesuits
American Roman Catholic priests
Roman Catholic bishops of Caroline Islands
Jesuit bishops